Vallter 2000 is a ski resort located in the eastern Pyrenees close to Setcases, Girona, Catalonia (Spain). It is located near the river source of the Ter River, surrounded by Bastiments, Gra de Fajol and Pic de la Dona. 

The ski area ranges between 2000 metres and 2535 metres in altitude, although the main buildings are located at an elevation of 2200 meters. Besides alpine skiing, the area is also popular for a range of off-mountain activities, including backcountry skiing, snowshoeing, ice climbing, and hiking.

Cycling
Vallter 2000 is the highest road climb in Catalonia and has hosted several road bicycle racing stage finishes in the Volta a Catalunya due to its 12.2km climb at an average gradient of 7.8% from Setcases.

References

See also
 Bastiments
 Gra de Fajol
 Gra de Fajol Petit
 Pic de la Dona

External links 
 
 History of Vallter 2000 

Ski areas and resorts in Catalonia